Frederick III of Holstein-Gottorp (22 December 1597 – 10 August 1659) was a Duke of Holstein-Gottorp.

He was the elder son of Duke Johann Adolf of Holstein-Gottorp and Princess Augusta of Denmark. His mother was a daughter of King Frederick II of Denmark.

He had ambitious plans concerning the development of sea trade. With this purpose he established Friedrichstadt in 1621, in sympathy with city of Glückstadt established in 1617 by Christian IV of Denmark. Furthermore, he attempted to find a commercial way to Russia and Persia that would not pass around Africa. For this reason he sent on 6 November 1633 the expedition from Hamburg to Moscow under the management of a commercial agent of Otto Brüggemann and a ducal adviser, Philipp Crusius, and with Adam Olearius as secretary. On 14 August 1634 the delegation arrived at Moscow. Although it was not successful in concluding a commercial agreement with Tsar Michael I of Russia, nevertheless, immediately after the return of the delegation to Gottorp on 6 April 1635, Frederick began the preparation of the following expedition.  In 1636, he sent his delegation to Persia, and in 1639 Safi of Persia sent a return delegation with presents for the Duke.

The difficult task of leading the country through the Thirty Years' War confronted Frederick. He tried a policy of neutrality, which meant in practice the refusal of the union with Denmark and inclinations toward Sweden.  In 1654 he hosted the recently abdicated Christina, Queen of Sweden.  She wrote to her successor to recommend two of his daughters as potential brides.  Thus, he married his daughter Hedvig Eleonora to King Charles X of Sweden. Since the Swedish attempt at being the Great Power ultimately failed,  Frederick's pro-Swedish policy led to the weakening of the house of Holstein-Gottorp.

Frederick as the patron of art and culture was more successful. Thus he founded on 3 September 1642 together with Prince Louis I of Anhalt-Köthen the Fruitbearing Society. Furthermore, he contributed to the creation of the Globe of Gottorf. The painter Jürgen Ovens worked more than 30 years for him and his successor Christian Albrecht of Holstein-Gottorp.

Family and children

He was married in Dresden on 21 February 1630 to Princess Marie Elisabeth of Saxony, daughter of Elector John George I of Saxony and Magdalene Sibylle of Prussia. They had the following children:
 Sofie Auguste (5 December 1630 – 12 December 1680), married on 16 September 1649 to John VI, Prince of Anhalt-Zerbst. Mother of John Louis I, Prince of Anhalt-Dornburg, grandmother of Christian August, Prince of Anhalt-Zerbst, and great-grandmother of Catherine II of Russia.
 Magdalene Sibylle (24 November 1631 – 22 September 1719), married on 28 November 1654 to Gustav Adolph, Duke of Mecklenburg-Güstrow. Mother of Louise of Mecklenburg-Güstrow, Queen of Denmark.
 Johann Adolf (29 September 1632 – 19 November 1633).
 Marie Elisabeth (6 June 1634 – 17 June 1665), married on 24 November 1650 to Louis VI, Landgrave of Hesse-Darmstadt.
 Friedrich (17 July 1635 – 12 August 1654).
 Hedwig Eleonore (23 October 1636 – 24 November 1715), married on 24 October 1654 to King Charles X of Sweden.
 Adolf August (1 September 1637 – 20 November 1637).
 Johann Georg (8 August 1638 – 25 November 1655).
 Anna Dorothea (13 February 1640 – 13 May 1713).
 Christian Albert, Duke of Holstein-Gottorp (3 February 1641 – 6 January 1695).
 Gustav Ulrich (16 March 1642 – 23 October 1642).
 Christine Sabine (11 July 1643 – 20 March 1644).
 August Friedrich (6 May 1646 – 2 October 1705), Prince-Regent of Eutin and Prince-Bishop of Lübeck; married on 21 June 1676 to Christine of Saxe-Weissenfels (daughter of Augustus, Duke of Saxe-Weissenfels, and his first wife Anna Maria of Mecklenburg-Schwerin). No issue.
 Adolf (24 August 1647 – 27 December 1647).
 Elisabeth Sofie (24 August 1647 – 16 November 1647), twin of Adolf.
 Auguste Marie (6 February 1649 – 25 April 1728), married on 15 May 1670 to Frederick VII, Margrave of Baden-Durlach.

Ancestors

Embassies
 The Voyages and Travells of the Ambassadors Sent by Frederick Duke of Holstein, to the Great Duke of Muscovy, and the King of Persia: Begun in the Year M.DC.XXXIII, and Finish'd in M.DC.XXXIX : Containing a Compleat History of Muscovy, Tartary, Persia, and Other Adjacent Countries : with Several Publick Transactions Reaching Near the Present Times : in VII Books (1669)

See also
 History of Schleswig-Holstein
 Globe of Gottorf

References

Dukes of Holstein-Gottorp
1597 births
1659 deaths